Phail Wynn, Jr. (c. 1948 – July 24, 2018) was an American academic administrator, corporate director and Vietnam War veteran. He was the president of the Durham Technical Community College from 1980 to 2007.

Early life
Wynn was born in an African-American family circa 1948 in Oklahoma. He graduated from the University of Oklahoma, where he earned a bachelor's degree. He earned a PhD from North Carolina State University and an MBA from the University of North Carolina at Chapel Hill. He joined the United States Army and served in Vietnam during the Vietnam War.

Career
Wynn served as the president of Durham Technical Community College from 1980 to 2007, and as the vice president for Durham and Regional Affairs at Duke University from 2007 to 2018.

Wynn served on the board of directors of SunTrust Banks from 2004 to 2018.

Wynn served on the Board, Leadership Council, and as Interim president of Triangle Community Foundation on two separate occasions.

Personal life and death
Wynn had a wife, Peggy, and a son, Rahsaan, a Marine Corps Master Gunnery Sergeant. They resided in Durham, North Carolina, where he died on July 24, 2018, at age 70. His funeral was held on July 30, 2018 at the Duke Chapel.

References

1940s births
2018 deaths
African-American United States Army personnel
Academics from Oklahoma
People from Durham, North Carolina
University of Oklahoma alumni
North Carolina State University alumni
UNC Kenan–Flagler Business School alumni
United States Army personnel of the Vietnam War
Duke University people
SunTrust Banks people
American corporate directors
United States Army officers
21st-century African-American people
African Americans in the Vietnam War
20th-century African-American academics
20th-century American academics